Pierrette Hélène Pinet, stage names Mademoiselle d'Épinay and Mademoiselle Molé (1740–1782), was a French stage actress. 

She was engaged at the Comédie-Française in 1760. She became a Sociétaires of the Comédie-Française in 1762. She retired in 1769 and married her colleague  François-René Molé. 

She mainly performed the role of love heroine in comedies, and confidante in tragedies. Among her roles where Julie in Fagans La Pupille, Alcmène in Molières L'Amphitryon, and tragic heroines such as Zaire, Inès de Castro and Bérénice.

References

External links 
   Mademoiselle Molé, Comédie-Française

1740 births
1782 deaths
18th-century French actresses
French stage actresses